Tropical fascism is a phrase sometimes used to describe post-colonial states which are either considered fascist or which are seen to have authoritarian tendencies, such as the Estado Novo and elements of Jair Bolsonaro's ideology in Brazil, and several historic regimes in Haiti, such as the presidency of Louis Borno or the later government of François Duvalier.

The Coalition for the Defence of the Republic and larger Hutu Power movement, a Hutu ultranationalist and supremacist movement that organized and committed the Rwandan genocide aimed at exterminating the Tutsi people of Rwanda, has been described as an example of "tropical fascism" in Africa.

Examples
Below are some examples of political parties, both active and inactive, that have been described as tropical fascist.

See also
 Duvalier dynasty
 Fascism in Africa
 Fascism in Asia
 Fascism in North America
 Fascism in South America

References

Fascism in Africa